Oreonebria picea is a species of ground beetle in the Nebriinae subfamily that can be found in Austria, France, Italy, and Switzerland.

References

picea
Beetles described in 1826
Beetles of Europe